Electric energy by country may refer to:
 Electric energy markets by country
 List of countries by electricity production
 List of countries by electricity consumption
 List of countries by electricity exports
 List of countries by electricity imports
 Mains electricity by country (incl. list of countries with the plugs, voltages and frequencies)